The 2018 Boca Raton Bowl was a college football bowl game played on December 18, 2018, with kickoff scheduled for 7:00 p.m. EST. It was the fifth edition of the Boca Raton Bowl, and one of the 2018–19 bowl games concluding the 2018 FBS football season. Sponsored by the Cheribundi beverage company, the game is officially known as the Cheribundi Boca Raton Bowl.

The game featured the UAB Blazers, champions of Conference USA, and the Northern Illinois Huskies, champions of the Mid-American Conference.  The Boca Raton Bowl was the first of three  2018–19 bowl games featuring two conference champions, along with the Orange Bowl and Rose Bowl. In just the second season since restarting its football program, the UAB Blazers defeated the Northern Illinois Huskies, 37–13, earning UAB their first-ever bowl victory.

Teams
Based on conference tie-ins, the bowl could invite teams from the American Athletic Conference (AAC) or Conference USA (C–USA) and the Mid-American Conference (MAC). On December 2, bowl organizers announced that the participating teams would be the UAB Blazers from C–USA and the Northern Illinois Huskies from the MAC. This was the first meeting between the two programs.

UAB Blazers

UAB won the 2018 Conference USA Football Championship Game on December 1, then accepted a bid to the Boca Raton Bowl on December 2. The Blazers entered the bowl with a 10–3 record (7–1 in conference).

Northern Illinois Huskies

Northern Illinois won the 2018 MAC Championship Game on November 30, then accepted a bid to the Boca Raton Bowl on December 2. The Huskies entered the bowl with an 8–5 record (6–2 in conference). Northern Illinois became the first team to make a second appearance in the Boca Raton Bowl, having played in the inaugural edition of the bowl in 2014.

Game summary

Scoring summary

Statistics

References

External links
 Box score at ESPN

Boca Raton Bowl
Boca Raton Bowl
Northern Illinois Huskies football bowl games
UAB Blazers football bowl games
Boca Raton Bowl
Boca Raton Bowl